The John A. Lynch was a ferryboat built in 1925 in Mariners Harbor, Staten Island.  It was named after NJ politician John A. Lynch, Sr. by NYC Mayor Hylan as were 15 other ferryboats built at the same time.  It was renamed first as the Harlam, then the Major General William H. Hart in 1940 when it was sold to the Army and assigned to Governors Island.  In 1968 it was donated to the South Street Seaport Museum where it was used as a school ship until 1990. It was traded to Captain's Cove Seaport, in Bridgeport Connecticut in exchange for docking proposed for the H.M.S. Rose at South Street for the 1992 quincentennial of Christopher Columbus' 1492 expedition. It was sold in about 2000 and was to be docked in New Jersey, but is currently half sunk and decaying at Port Reading, New Jersey.  It was added to the National Register of Historic Places on September 7, 1984.

References

External links
A kayack visit to the wreck

Ships on the National Register of Historic Places in New Jersey
South Street Seaport
National Register of Historic Places in Middlesex County, New Jersey